Agnidra fulvior is a moth in the family Drepanidae. It was described by Watson in 1968. It is found in China (Yunnan).

References

Moths described in 1968
Drepaninae
Moths of Asia